Tom Olivadotti is a former American football coach. He coached in high school, college and the National Football League (NFL). He was the Miami Dolphins defensive coordinator from 1987 to 1995. He also coached in the NFL for the Cleveland Browns, Minnesota Vikings, New York Giants and Houston Texans. He coached in college for the Princeton Tigers, Boston College Eagles and Miami Hurricanes, where he was the defensive coordinator for the 1983 championship team.

His son Kirk Olivadotti is also a coach.

References

Living people
Upsala Vikings football players
Princeton Tigers football coaches
Boston College Eagles football coaches
Miami Hurricanes football coaches
Cleveland Browns coaches
Miami Dolphins coaches
Minnesota Vikings coaches
New York Giants coaches
Houston Texans coaches
National Football League defensive coordinators
Year of birth missing (living people)